Mokerang Airfield, was an airfield on the northwest tip of Los Negros Island,  NNW of Momote Airfield.

History
It was built by the Imperial Japanese at Mokerang Plantation shortly after Lorengau Airfield during World War II and liberated during the Battle of Los Negros as part of the Admiralty Islands campaign.

The runways had a bearing WNW/ESE 114 degrees/294 degrees magnetic. A storage depot for 30,000 barrels of fuel was stockpiled at Mokerang.

The airfield was abandoned at the end of the war and has been reclaimed by vegetation.

Units based at Mokerang
13th Air Force (13th Air Task Force)
307th Bombardment Group HQ
424th Bombardment Squadron (B-24s)
370th Bombardment Squadron (B-24s)
371st Bombardment Squadron (B-24s)
372nd Bombardment Squadron (B-24s)
XIII Bomber Command, 13th Air Force
18th Fighter Group, 419th Night Fighter Squadron (detachment) P-61s

References
Australian War Museum - Mokerang Airfield Photo and Description
Pacific War Wreck Database - Mokerang Airfield

Closed installations of the United States Army
Airfields of the United States Army Air Forces in Papua New Guinea